The Delano South Beach hotel was an upscale resort located in Miami Beach, Florida. Delano was a part of the Morgans Hotel Group collection prior to MHG being purchased by SBE Entertainment Group. SBE Entertainment has since sold the hotel to Eldridge, and the hotel has been closed to the public since March 2020.
 

The Hotel is located directly on the beach. The Delano was known for its whimsical, art-deco styling and its celebrity clientele, and its pool was one of the few hotel pools in Miami Beach where female toplessness was allowed. In 2007, the Delano South Beach was ranked in the American Institute of Architects list of "America's Favorite Architecture". On April 18, 2012, the AIA's Florida Chapter placed the Delano South Beach on its list of Florida Architecture: 100 Years. 100 Places.

History 
Designed by architect Robert Swartburg, the Delano was built in 1947 by Rob and Rose Schwartz. The hotel was originally utilized for military housing. The then four-winged Art Deco tower of the Delano was the tallest building in Miami Beach. The 1994 renovations were designed by Philippe Starck.
The hotel was named after US President Franklin Delano Roosevelt.

References

External links 
 Delano South Beach

Hotels in Miami Beach, Florida
Art Deco hotels
Art Deco architecture in Florida
Hotels established in 1947
Hotel buildings completed in 1947
1947 establishments in Florida